The 2015 Delray Beach International Tennis Championships was a professional tennis tournament played on hard courts. It was the 23rd edition of the tournament, and part of the 2015 ATP World Tour. It took place in Delray Beach, United States between 16 February and 22 February 2015.

Singles main-draw entrants

Seeds

1 Rankings as of February 9, 2015

Other entrants 
The following players received wildcards into the main draw:
 Stefan Kozlov
 Denis Kudla
 Andrey Rublev

The following players received entry from the qualifying draw:
 Thanasi Kokkinakis
 Yoshihito Nishioka
 Eric Quigley
 John-Patrick Smith

Withdrawals
Before the tournament
  Benjamin Becker → replaced by Stéphane Robert
  Marin Čilić → replaced by Dustin Brown
  Juan Martín del Potro → replaced by Tim Smyczek 
  Jack Sock → replaced by Filip Krajinović
  Radek Štěpánek → replaced by Viktor Troicki

Retirements
  Mikhail Kukushkin (illness)
  Sam Querrey (back injury)

Doubles main-draw entrants

Seeds 

1 Rankings are as of February 9, 2015.

Withdrawals 
During the tournament
  Sam Querrey (back injury)

Finals

Singles 

  Ivo Karlović defeated  Donald Young, 6–3, 6–3

Doubles 

  Bob Bryan /  Mike Bryan defeated  Raven Klaasen /  Leander Paes, 6–3, 3–6, [10–6]

Team legends 

  Team International defeated  Team USA, 6–3

References

External links
 Official website

Delray Beach International Tennis Championships
Delray Beach International Tennis Championships
Delray Beach International Tennis Championships
Delray Beach International Tennis Championships
2015 Delray Beach International Tennis Championships